Lagi may refer to:

People
 Lagi Dyer (born 1972), Fijian football player
 Lagi Letoa, Samoan lawn bowler
 Lagi Setu (born 1988), Samoan rugby league player
 Lagi Tuima (born 1998), English rugby union player
 Lagi von Ballestrem

Other uses
 Lagi, Laconia, a settlement in Laconia, Greece